Mordington, also known as the Douqlass House, is a historic home located near Frederica, Kent County, Delaware.  It dates to about 1785, and is a -story, three bay, double-pile plan, brick dwelling in the Georgian-style.  It has a lower frame and brick wing to the east that was replaced in the late 1960s. The original two main doorways and most of the original interior woodwork were removed to the Winterthur Museum and Country Estate.

It was listed on the National Register of Historic Places in 1973.

References

External links

Houses on the National Register of Historic Places in Delaware
Houses completed in 1747
Houses in Kent County, Delaware
Historic American Buildings Survey in Delaware
National Register of Historic Places in Kent County, Delaware